Digital art theft is the act of stealing art that has been created on a virtual medium. Digital art is an artistic work that uses the medium of digital technology as part of the creative and/or presentation process. Digital artists commonly use digital media platforms, including social media, to display their works.

Digital art theft can include cropping, editing, the claiming of an artist's piece as one's own, and more. Digital art is often stolen by being claimed as property by a person who is not the original creator, then often sold for profit. Recently, with the rise of the non-fungible token (NFT) market (also known as the "NFT boom"), digital art theft has seen a sharp rise as thieves take original art and mint it as an NFT without the artist's knowledge. "Minting" an NFT means uniquely publishing a token on the blockchain in order to make it purchasable. NFTs were create around 2017, and from it a marketplace that caters to digital art selling and collecting has emerged.

In this context, the scope of "digital art theft" does not include online piracy, often associated with music, films, and other video content. In addition, the scope does not include the use of digital technology to steal non-digital art. For example, new technological advances have allowed forgers to recreate and sell original pieces that remarkably resemble the authentic piece.

Types of digital art theft

NFT theft 
Currently, the most common and profitable form of digital art theft is NFT art theft, either via hacking or piracy. NFT artworks can be sold individually or as part of a collection. NFT art can include digital works that can range from previously physical pieces that have been destroyed to create artificial scarcity to tweets. For example, in March 2021, a blockchain company burned an original work by famous street artist Banksy during a livestream, and subsequently sold the now-digital artwork as an NFT for $380,000 worth of Ethereum. The work, Morons, depicts a critique of the fine art market. Artificial scarcity has further driven up the profitability of NFTs and thus incentivized digital art thieves.

Much of the digital art theft is being done via automated bots.

Hacking 
Due to the boom in the NFT art market (estimated sales in 2021 vary from $25 million to $41 million) and the digital art trade totals (the most expensive NFT art sale to a single owner as of May 4, 2022 is Everydays -- The First 5000 Days by Beeple, which sold for $69 million), hackers have targeted NFT projects and companies, commonly through phishing.

Hackers will often create a phishing link and post it on different online platforms, including social media, to target NFT projects and/or NFT art collectors. Once victims click on the link, the hacker(s) gains access to the victim's crypto wallet, locks the victim out of their accounts, and empties out their assets. In this manner, hackers gain possession of artworks from collectors' and artists' online accounts.

Piracy 
Thieves seeking to steal digital art, usually via automated bots, scour the internet in search of digital art that has often not been copyrighted and/or minted as an NFT yet. This method of theft is facilitated by the fact that anyone can mint an NFT without much vetting.

Notable cases

Qing Han 
Qing Han was a digital artist who rose to fame from April 2018 until her death in February 2020 at the age of 29. Qing Han was diagnosed with stage four cancer in December 2019. Near the end of her life, her art began to revolve around and reflect her battle with chronic illness and her cancer relapse. In April 2021, it was discovered that Qing Han's artworks had been stolen and were being sold as NFTs by an account on Twinci. Twinci is an app that serves as an NFT marketplace. The account was selling one of her more popular pieces, titled Bird Cage, which Qing Han had posted one month before her death. Bird Cage depicts a girl's heart trapped by her ribcages. The heart is depicted as a bird. At the time Qing Han published the piece on social media, she was in a cardiac intensive care unit.

Aja Trier 
Aja Trier is a painter who creates work inspired by The Starry Night by Vincent van Gogh. In early 2022, she discovered that her works had been minted into 86,000 NFTs and were being sold on OpenSea. By the time she was able to convince the platform to take down her stolen works, thirty-seven pieces had already sold.

Prevention 
The burden of prevention falls on the artist. It is up to the artist to take the initiative of preventing theft and protecting their work. Placing signatures or watermarks on the piece is not a completely protected method to prevent theft because these markings can always be erased or cropped.

Artists can also copyright their work to protect it. Art is considered copyright protected from the moment it is created. Yet, formally registering a copyright for an artwork provides an added layer of legal protection. However, registering a single artwork with the United States government costs about $45. A new registration must be completed for every individual artwork.

Recovery 
it is up to the artist to discover if their artwork is being sold for auction without their consent. Artists often have to actively search for their own work on NFT websites to ensure their work is not being sold without their knowledge or consent. With the extreme rise in thefts due to the sharp rise in profitability of the NFT market, however, artists are finding themselves single-handedly having to deal with hundreds upon thousands of fraudulent listings of their art, compared to a few listings per day prior to the "NFT boom."

DeviantArt 
DeviantArt is an online art community for digital artists that features artwork, videography, and photography. It hosts half a billion pieces of digital art. In fall 2021, it began monitoring the public blockchains and third-party marketplaces in search of stolen artwork owned by their users. With their imaging recognition software, DeviantArt Protect, DeviantArt alerts artists when someone has uploaded art that possibly belong to them. In addition, DeviantArt has also expanded the scope of its software to identify near identical matches of minted NFTs submitted across the internet.

Fraudulent digital art trade 
There is currently no effective system to ensure that buyers are purchasing a legitimately owned digital artwork because it is fairly easy to claim authentic ownership of a stolen NFT.

OpenSea 
OpenSea is one of the largest NFT marketplaces. It has grown at a quick pace, and is worth $13.3 billion as of January 2022. The company has done very little to prevent the trade of stolen and fraudulent NFTs. OpenSea's vetting system is relatively weak, facilitating the sale of stolen digital art. When artists find their stolen art on OpenSea and file a takedown request to the company, the wait time can last weeks. In some cases, artists' request to have their stolen art taken down has been denied. In response to backlash, OpenSea announced in January 2022 that it would limit its "free listing" tool, which had previously allowed individuals to mint NFTs without adding them to the blockchain. OpenSea explained its decision, "Over 80 percent of the items created with this tool were plagiarized works, fake collections, and spam." However, NFT creators were unhappy by this decision, prompting OpenSea to roll back the short-lived policy.

References 

Theft
Art thieves
Copyright infringement
Hacking (computer security)
Organized crime activity
Plagiarism
Stolen works of art
Theft